The Chancellor James P. Carroll House, located in Aiken, South Carolina, was built in 1855 by James Parsons Carroll, Chancellor of South Carolina. Mr. Carroll was elected to the South Carolina House of Representatives in 1838, later served in the South Carolina Senate, and in 1859, was elected Chancellor of the Court of Equity. Carroll also served as a delegate to the Secession Convention and signed the Ordinance of Secession. The landmark was listed in the National Register of Historic Places November 23, 1977.

References

Houses on the National Register of Historic Places in South Carolina
Georgian architecture in South Carolina
Houses in Aiken County, South Carolina
National Register of Historic Places in Aiken County, South Carolina
Buildings and structures in Aiken, South Carolina